706 Naval Air Squadron (706 NAS) was a Naval Air Squadron of the Royal Navy's Fleet Air Arm. Established as a fighter and torpedo-bomber training unit in Australia at the end of World War Two, it was briefly reformed as a helicopter squadron in the early 1950s, before becoming a helicopter training unit in 1962, and operating until 1998.

First formation
The squadron was formed in the UK in January 1945 and sailed for Australia where it was officially commissioned on 10 April 1945 at RNAS Schofields near Schofields, New South Wales. It operated as a refresher training and conversion unit for the British Pacific Fleet, flying the Grumman Avenger, Fairey Barracuda, Vought Corsair, Fairey Firefly, Grumman Hellcat and Supermarine Seafire. In January 1946 the unit returned to Schofields, and was disbanded on 31 May 1946.

Second formation
The squadron was reformed at RNAS Gosport on 7 September 1953 flying the Westland Whirlwind HAS.22 ASW helicopter and the Hiller HT.1. In October 1953 it moved to Northern Ireland, firstly to RNAS Sydenham near Belfast, then in February 1954 to RNAS Eglinton, being occasionally based aboard . The squadron was disbanded on 1 March 1954, and its aircraft were transferred to 845 Naval Air Squadron.

Third formation
In January 1962 the squadron was reformed for a second time as a helicopter training unit at RNAS Culdrose flying the Westland Wessex HAS.1. 706 Squadron's B Flight was formed at Culdrose on 7 January 1964 and equipped with the Wessex and Hiller HT.2 to operate in the Commando Assault role, but was incorporated into 845 Squadron when it arrived in Borneo to take part in the Indonesia–Malaysia confrontation. In November 1964 the squadron received Westland Wasp HAS.1's for advanced training. In January 1970 it converted to the Westland Sea King HAS.1, and in February 1975 Wasp training was transferred to 703 Squadron. From February 1978 until April 1993 it was administrative host for the Royal Air Force's Sea King Training Unit. The squadron continued with Sea King flying training, with sea training conducted aboard , until disbanded in February 1998.

Aircraft flown
The squadron operated a variety of different aircraft and versions:
 Grumman Avenger I, II & III
 Fairey Barracuda II
 Vought Corsair II & IV
 Fairey Firefly I
 Grumman Hellcat I & II
 Supermarine Seafire III & XV
 Hiller HT.1
 Westland Whirlwind HAS.2
 Westland Wessex HAS.1 & HAS.3
 Westland Wasp HAS.1
 Westland Sea King HAS.1, HAS.2/2A, HAR.3, HAS.5 & HAS.6

References

Citations

Bibliography

 

700 series Fleet Air Arm squadrons
Air squadrons of the Royal Navy in World War II
Military units and formations established in 1945